Johns Manville is an American company based in Denver, Colorado, that manufactures insulation, roofing materials and engineered products.  For much of the 20th century, the then-titled Johns-Manville Corporation was the global leader in the manufacture of asbestos-containing products, including asbestos pipe insulation, asbestos shingles, asbestos roofing materials and asbestos cement pipe.

The stock of Johns-Manville Corporation had been included in the Dow Jones Industrial Average from January 29, 1930 to August 27, 1982, when it was replaced by American Express.  In 1981, Johns-Manville Corporation was renamed simply Manville.  In 1982, facing unprecedented liability for asbestos injury claims, the company voluntarily filed for bankruptcy under Chapter 11 of the U.S. Bankruptcy Code.

Berkshire Hathaway bought the company in 2001, then chairman and CEO Jerry Henry retired in 2004. At that point, Steve Hochhauser became chairman, president and CEO. Todd Raba succeeded him in the summer of 2007; he came from MidAmerican Energy Holdings, another Berkshire Hathaway company. In November 2012, Mary Rhinehart was named president and CEO, and she added the title of chairman in 2014. In September 2020, Bob Wamboldt became CEO and president, while Rhinehart remained as chairman.

Today, Johns Manville is a manufacturer and marketer of products for building insulation, mechanical insulation, commercial roofing and roof insulation, as well as fibers and non-woven materials for commercial, industrial and residential applications. The company serves markets that include aerospace, automotive and transportation, air handling, appliance, HVAC, pipe and equipment, filtration, waterproofing, building, flooring, interiors and wind energy. Johns Manville has annual sales over $3 billion. The company employs 8,000 people and operates 46 manufacturing facilities in North America and Europe.

History

Early years
The present-day Johns Manville company traces its origins to two early manufacturers of construction materials. At the age of 21, Henry Ward Johns had already patented roofing and insulation products. In 1858, he founded the H.W. Johns Manufacturing Company in New York City. In 1885, the Manville Covering Company was established in Wisconsin by Charles B. Manville, whose grandson was the much-married socialite Tommy Manville.

In 1901, the H.W. Johns Manufacturing Company and the Manville Covering Company merged to form the H.W. Johns-Manville Company. In 1926, the firm was renamed to Johns-Manville Corporation. During the 1930s, industrialist Lewis H. Brown was president of the company. In 1949, the Canadian branch of the company was involved in the Asbestos Strike at its mines in Asbestos, Quebec.

In 1958, Johns-Manville bought Glass Fibers, Inc., based in Toledo, Ohio, from Randolph Barnard. This purchase propelled the company's insulation division. At that time, Dominick Labino was working for Glass Fibers; Barnard and Labino both joined Johns-Manville. Glass Fibers had several plants in Waterville and Defiance, which are still in operation under Johns Manville,

Beginning just after World War II, sculptor Beverly Bender spent thirty-two years working in the art department of Johns-Manville, creating animal sculpture in her free time.

Asbestos litigation and bankruptcy
Starting as early as 1929, Johns-Manville employees began claiming disability from lung diseases. The claims settled out of court, with a secrecy order. In 1943, Samac Laboratory in New York confirmed the link between asbestos and cancer, but Johns-Manville suppressed the report. From approximately 1930 to 1950, attorney Vandiver Brown handled involvement in such lawsuits. Files and testimony alleged that "[Johns-Manville] maintained a policy into the 1970s of not telling its employes that their physical examinations showed signs of asbestosis".

In 1943, Johns-Manville suppressed a report confirming the link between asbestos and cancer. During the 1960s, 1970s and 1980s, the company faced thousands of individual and class action lawsuits based on asbestos-related injuries such as asbestosis, lung cancer and malignant mesothelioma. Many new settlements included offering $600 for asbestosis, while the FAIR Act called for $12,000 for this condition level.

As a result, the company voluntarily filed for chapter 11 bankruptcy protection in 1982. At that time, it was the largest company in United States history to have done so. The filing shocked financial analysts, but a few, such as Gary J. Aguirre, had predicted the filing and had forced the company to post a bond to guarantee payment to their clients.

The bankruptcy was resolved by the formation of the Manville Trust to pay asbestos tort claimants in an orderly fashion by giving the trust the lion's share of the equity in the company.  The bankruptcy took over five years to process and resulted in protracted litigation.  The Manville Trust is still in operation today.

Post-bankruptcy
The company emerged from Chapter 11 in 1988 as the Manville Corporation. In 1997, the company changed its name back to Johns Manville (but without the hyphen), and this is the name under which it does business today. In 2001, Johns Manville became a wholly owned subsidiary of Berkshire Hathaway.

In 2012, Johns Manville appointed a new CEO, Mary Rhinehart. She was the CFO for Johns Manville and had been with the company for over 33 years. In 2020, Bob Wamboldt became the president and CEO, while Rhinehart remained as chairman.

Manville, New Jersey
The town of Manville, New Jersey, is named for the company. It had a large manufacturing plant in the borough.

References

External links

 
 About the class action suit in the Asbestos Hazards Handbook (London Hazards Centre)
 Johns Manville 150 year commemoration publication
 Home Insulation site
 Building Materials site
 Energy Tax Credit
 Insulation
 Manville Trust

Glassmaking companies of the United States
Asbestos
Companies based in New York City
Manufacturing companies based in Denver
Manville, New Jersey
Manufacturing companies established in 1858
1858 establishments in New York (state)
Former components of the Dow Jones Industrial Average
Berkshire Hathaway
Superfund sites in Illinois